Marie-Louise de Beauvoir née Cousin (17 August 1776, Pas-de-Calais-1855), was a Belgian pioneer educator. She was the founder of the first secular school for girls in Belgium, the «Maison d’éducation de demoiselles» in Liège, which was to be regarded as the perhaps most fashionable girls school in the country, and was its manager in 1816–1852. One of her students was the pioneer educator Léonie de Waha, who founded a college for girls, l'école supérieure de demoiselles (1868, from 1878 known as lycée Léonie de Waha).

She was married to the French politician Louis-Etienne Beffroy de Beauvoir, and followed him to Liège when he was exiled during the Bourbon Restoration for having voted for the execution of Louis XVI of France during the French revolution.

References 
 Biographie National
 http://www.lalibre.be/regions/liege/la-sepulture-de-marie-louise-de-beauvoir-51b88c19e4b0de6db9ace903

1776 births
1855 deaths
19th-century Belgian educators